Julian Grupp (born July 29, 1991) is a German footballer who plays for Neckarsulmer SU.

External links

1991 births
Living people
German footballers
SSV Reutlingen 05 players
SG Sonnenhof Großaspach players
SV Wehen Wiesbaden players
TuS Koblenz players
3. Liga players
Regionalliga players
Oberliga (football) players
1. FC Normannia Gmünd players
Association football fullbacks
People from Schwäbisch Gmünd
Sportspeople from Stuttgart (region)
Footballers from Baden-Württemberg